The Intelligencer is a daily (except Saturday) morning broadsheet newspaper published in Langhorne, Pennsylvania. The newspaper serves central and northern Bucks County as well as adjacent areas of eastern Montgomery County. It is owned by Gannett.

History
The newspaper started in 1804 as the Pennsylvania Correspondent and Farmers' Advertiser, a weekly newspaper in Doylestown.  In 1876, the Bucks County Intelligencer moved to an ornate building at 10 E. Court St. in Doylestown, where it was located until 1973.

In 1886, the newspaper became a daily, which called itself The Doylestown Daily Intelligencer.

In 1973, The Daily Intelligencer moved its headquarters to 333 N. Broad St. in Doylestown, and dropped the "Daily" part of its name in the 1990s.

Up until the 1970s, it published as an afternoon newspaper Monday through Saturday.  It dropped the Saturday edition for a short time in the late 1970s when it added a Sunday morning edition.

It also published a sister newspaper, the Montgomery County Record (later The Record) in the 1980s and 1990s.  As the Montgomery County Record, it was an independent subsidiary competing with its parent newspaper, arriving on the same doorsteps as The Daily Intelligencer.

Later, as The Record, that sister paper was merely a Montgomery County edition of The Daily Intelligencer.

Previously owned by Calkins Media, Inc., The Intelligencer  publishes a morning edition six days a week, publishing it seven days a week until February 7, 2009, when it dropped its Saturday edition. In 2017 The Intelligencer was purchased by GateHouse Media.

In addition to its daily newspaper publication, The Intelligencer also posts news online. The newspaper has its own website on theintell.com, which it launched on September 3, 2013. Before this time it shared a site with its sister Calkins Media newspapers Bucks County Courier Times and Burlington County Times.

The paper announced in May 2018 that it was leaving its office in Doylestown.

A timeline of the paper's mastheads:

 1804 - 1822    Pennsylvania Correspondent and Farmers' Advertiser
 1822 - 1824    Correspondent and Farmers' Advertiser
 1824 - 1826    Bucks County Patriot and Farmers' Advertiser
 1827 - 1842    The Bucks County Intelligencer and General Advertiser
 1843 - 1886    Bucks County Intelligencer
 1886 - 1955    Doylestown Daily Intelligencer
 1955 - 1998    The Daily Intelligencer
 1998–present   The Intelligencer

Prices
The Intelligencer single-copy prices are: $1.00 Daily, $1.75 Sunday.

References

External links

Daily newspapers published in Pennsylvania
Bucks County, Pennsylvania
Montgomery County, Pennsylvania
Publications established in 1804
Gannett publications